Prema Prema Prema is a 1999 Indian Kannada-language romantic drama film directed by S. Siddalingaiah and starring Suresh Raj, Sindhu Menon and Ramya. The film is based on the novel Talemaaru by Ramdas. After this film, Siddalingaiah took a break from direction.

Cast 
Suresh Raj as Ramanna and Singappa 
Sindhu Menon as Savithri 
Ramya as Kadamma 
Kashi
Dheerendra Gopal

Production 
Sindhu Menon debuted as a heroine with this film at the age of thirteen.

Reception 
Srikanth of Deccan Herald called the film "A clean and wholesome family entertainer!" A critic from The New Indian Express said that "VETERAN director-cum-producer Siddalingaiah has not kept pace with the changing trends. Though Prema is not like other re-makes, it would have been a better film had Siddalingaiah taken a little more care in casting and dialogue".

References